Enzo da Ponte (born 31 March 1973) is a Paraguayan fencer. He competed in the individual foil and épée events at the 1992 Summer Olympics. He is the son of fencer Rodolfo da Ponte.

References

External links
 

1973 births
Living people
Paraguayan male foil fencers
Olympic fencers of Paraguay
Fencers at the 1992 Summer Olympics
Paraguayan male épée fencers
20th-century Paraguayan people